Muhammad Farooq is a journalist, Qari, Naat Khawan and newscaster from Pakistan. He also worked as Joint Executive Editor Daily Mashriq Quetta. Nowadays he is working in Daily Pakistan Lahore as a News Editor. He also had worked for Pakistan Television Corporation(PTV) and Radio Pakistan. 

Muhammad Farooq has also participated in many national and some international Mahafil-e-Qirat and Mahafil-e-Na`at. He has been awarded numerous national awards, including the Pride of Performance Award (2000) from Pakistan Broadcasting Corporation (PBC), Pakistan Television also nominated him for PTV Award.

Journalistic career

Muhammad Farooq started his career in journalism as a sub editor from the Daily Mashriq Lahore. He has also served as the Bureau Chief Lahore for Daily Mashriq Quetta. In 1997, Farooq moved to Quetta and was appointed as the chief news editor of the Daily Mashriq Quetta. On 10 August 2001, he launched first Pakistani evening newspaper Daily Evening Special from Quetta as founding editor.

In 2004, Muhammad Farooq became as the Joint Executive Editor of Daily Mashriq Quetta. He also served as editor in the Universal News Agency (UNA), in Quetta head office. During his journalistic career he also worked for Daily Din Lahore, Daily Akhbar-e-Lahore, Monthly Education Times Lahore, At present he is working as the news editor for Daily Pakistan Lahore, one of the leading newspapers of Pakistan.

He has also struggled for the freedom of the press and for the rights of working journalists.

Newscasting
In 1997, Farooq joined Radio Pakistan (Quetta) as a newsreader. 

In 2000, Muhammad Farooq was awarded the Pride of Performance Award by Pakistani state radio in recognition of his work. Farooq also worked many years for Pakistan Television as a newscaster.

Analyst and compere
He has been an analyst and compere of Pakistan Television. He appeared in many talk shows regarding political and social issues, aspecially current affairs programs including News Morning Show and Qadam ba Qadam from PTV Quetta centre.

Writing
As a script writer for Pakistan Television, Farooq wrote for many different Pakistani television programs including current affairs. He focuses on the different problems of people of Balochistan. Farooq has also written scripts about Khushhal Pakistan Program, rural development and cities of Baluchistan. He has written many articles, columns, and translations for different magazines and newspapers.

As a Qari
Farooq is the winner of Pakistani national Qur'an recitation contests, and also the winner of many Qur'an reciting competitions at All Pakistan Inter Schools, colleges and universities.

Muhammad Farooq has recited in front of many internationally famous and respected figures including Egyptian Qari Shaikh Sayed Abdul Aal Mutawlli, Qari Shaikh Anwar Shahaat Mahmood Anwar, Qari Shaikh Mahmood Shahaat Anwar, Qari Hussain Shah and Qari Abdur Rasheed Al Azhari. Muhammad Farooq has also participated in many national and some international Mahafil-e-Qirat. He has also hosted many Mahafil-e-Qiraat in different cities of Pakistan including Karachi, Quetta, Sialkot, Narowal, Gujranwala, and Lahore.

Career in Naat Khawani
He started Naat Khuwani, when he was a student of Pakistan Navy School, Karachi, Pakistan.
 
Farooq has also many times won the All Pakistan Naat recitation competition. After many years Muhammad Farooq restarted his career on Pakistan Television, Quetta Centre as a Naat Khawan, newscaster, script writer, analyst and compere.

He got national fame when he recited his most popular naat "Mujh ko kis din hogi tayaba ke safar ki agahi" in Urdu (مجھ کو کس دن ہوگی طیبہ کے سفر کی آگہی), Telecast on Pakistan Television. He has also performed live on different Pakistani TV and Radio Channels. He also recorded Naats for Radio Pakistan and FM 101 radio from Quetta. He also performed live these radio channels. In 2006, Pakistan Television nominated him as the best Naat Khawan for PTV Award from PTV Quetta centre. Muhammad Farooq has also participated in many national and some international Mahafil-e-Naat. He appears regularly on Pakistan Television and Radio Pakistan.

Awards

Journalism
Pride of Performance Award (2000) from Pakistan Broadcasting Corporation (PBC) Best Urdu Newscaster Award (National).
Fatima Jinnah Award (2003). Presented by The Government of Pakistan's Ex Federal Minister for Religious Affairs and Minorities Muhammad Ijaz-ul-Haq
Special Award Presented by UNICEF & Balochistan Scouts Association.
Award from National Civil Defence of Pakistan
Best Journalist award (2004) Presented by Ex MPA Balochistan Miss Rahila Durani and Muhammad Shafiq Khan. (Awarded by Ghosiya Blood Donors Association)

Qur'an recitation
First Position All Pakistan Quraan Recitation Competition (1990)
Best Qari National Award (1992)
Award from Daily Jang Lahore
Wahdat-e-Pakistan Award
Award from Daily Mashriq Lahore
Award for Excellent Performance (2008), by Minhaj-ul-Quran International and Lahore Press Club. Presented by Nazim-e-Ala Minhaj-ul-Quran International Raheeq Ahmad Abbasi.

Naat Khawani
First Position All Pakistan Naat Khawani Competition (1991)
Best Naat Khawan National Award (1993)
Wahdat-i-Pakistan Award (1993)
PTV Awards Best Naat Khawan 
(2006) Nomination

Works
There are many different serials and programs written by Muhammad Farooq for Pakistan Television.

Scripts
Khushhal Pakistan serials (2002)
Pak Japan Friend Ship (2002)
Rural Youth (2002)
Karkardagi serial (2003)
Dastan-e-Azm serial (2003)
Umar Khan Achakzai (2003)
Qadam Ba Qadam serial (2004)
Behtar Zindagi Behtar Mahole (2005)

Naat Khawani

Naats on PTV
Na pucho kitne sooraj jagmagae khana-e-dil main ( نہ پوچھو کتنے سورج جگمگائے خانہءدل میں )
Mujh ko kis din hogi tayaba ke safar ki aagahi ( مجھ کو کس دن ہوگی طیبہ کے سفر کی آگہی )
Wohi zikr-e- share habib hai wohi rahguzar khiayl hai ( وہی ذکر شہر حبیب ہے وہی راہگذار خیال ہے )

Naats on Radio Pakistan
Meri sari umar ka hasil jo bhi kuch hai jitna bhi kuch
Main hoon benawa main shikasta dil mujhe arzoo-e-wisal hai
Patte khushboo dhanak ( پتے خوشبودھنک )

Live performance
Allah hu Allah hu Allah hu Allah

See also  

List of PTV Personalities
List of Famous Newsreaders of Radio Pakistan
List of Famous Qurrā'
List of Naat Khawans
List of Pakistanis
List of people from Lahore
Daily Evening Special
Daily Mashriq
Daily Pakistan
Pakistan Broadcasting Corporation
Hafiz
Qur'an
Tajwid

References

External links  
Muhammad Farooq – Official website
Official youtube channel
Muhammad Farooq journalist

Videos 
 Qur'an recitation, Surah e Al-Hashr
 Naat on PTV-Wohi zikr-e- share habib hai wohi rahguzar khiayl hai ( وہی ذکر شہر حبیب ہے وہی راہگذار خیال ہے )
 Naat on PTV-Mujh ko kis din hogi tayaba ke safar ki aagahi ( مجھ کو کس دن ہوگی طیبہ کے سفر کی آگہی )

Living people
Year of birth missing (living people)
Pakistani Quran reciters
Pakistani performers of Islamic music
Pakistani male journalists
Pakistani television journalists
Pakistani television writers
Pakistani radio personalities
Pakistani writers
Pakistani newspaper editors
Pakistani Muslims
People from Sialkot
Punjabi people
Pakistani newspaper founders
Journalists from Karachi
Male television writers